Who Is It may refer to:

 "Who Is It" (Michael Jackson song)
 "Who Is It" (Björk song)
 "Who Is It", a song by Talking Heads from Talking Heads: 77